Jürgen Barth (12 May 1943 – 17 January 2011) was a German cyclist. He competed at the 1968 Summer Olympics and the 1972 Summer Olympics.

References

External links
 

1943 births
2011 deaths
German male cyclists
Olympic cyclists of West Germany
Cyclists at the 1968 Summer Olympics
Cyclists at the 1972 Summer Olympics
Cyclists from Berlin